Kenneth N. Beers was an American medical doctor who served as a NASA flight surgeon during the Project Gemini and Apollo Program eras. Beers died on September 20, 2017.

Education
Beers did his undergraduate work at Muhlenberg College.  In 1956, Dr. Beers graduated from Jefferson Medical College of Thomas Jefferson University. On September 20, 1962, he received his California medical license.

Organizations
Beers was president of the Society of NASA Flight Engineers.

Career
Beers was professor emeritus at the Wright State University medical school.

References

External links
 Photo of Beers with astronauts Neil Armstrong and David Scott during Gemini training.

Muhlenberg College alumni
Wright State University faculty
Living people
American surgeons
NASA people
Year of birth missing (living people)